The 1984 Crispa Redmanizers season was the tenth and final season of the franchise in the Philippine Basketball Association (PBA).

Colors
Crispa Redmanizers    (dark)    (light)

Transactions

Milestone
Fortunato "Atoy" Co became the first PBA player to score 10,000 points by tallying 32 markers in Crispa's 107-111 loss to Northern Consolidated.(NCC) on May 1.

Occurrences
On July 1, Crispa coach Tommy Manotoc, citing health reasons, resigns after leading the Redmanizers to the All-Filipino Conference finals by winning over Northern (NCC), 96-94. Assistant coach Narciso Bernardo takes over as Crispa's head mentor.

13th PBA title
The Crispa Redmanizers captured their 13th and final PBA crown by winning the First All-Filipino Conference title over Gilbey's Gin, four games to one. Coach Narciso Bernardo won his first title with the Redmanizers.

Last finals stint
The Redmanizers return to the finals in the Invitational Championship. Crispa played Great Taste in the best-of-five finale. The Redmanizers lost Game one by a rout, but won the next two games to move within a win of capturing another title. The Coffee Makers came back with a victory in Game four to tie the series and force a deciding fifth game.

On December 18, the Redmanizers trailed by as many as 28 points in the final quarter of Game five and lost to Great Taste, 106-127, in what turn out to be the final game of the winningest ballclub in the league.

Won-loss records vs Opponents

Roster

References

External links
 Crispa Redmanizers: 1984 PBA All-Filipino champions@interbasket.net

Crispa Redmanizers seasons
Crispa